Alessandro Casolani (1552–1606) was an Italian painter of the late-Renaissance period, active mainly in Siena.

Biography
He was also called Alessandro della Torre. He was born at Siena, and was the pupil of Ventura Salimbeni and of Cristoforo Roncalli. His works are principally in the churches of Siena, but are also found in Naples and Genoa. He also etched one plate, a Madonna. His son, Ilario Casolani was also a painter. Among the pupils of Casolani are Bernardino Capitelli, Sebastiano Folli, and Giovanni Biliverti.

Works

Frescoes at Certosa di Pavia with Pietro Sorri

References

1552 births
1606 deaths
16th-century Italian painters
Italian male painters
17th-century Italian painters
Painters from Siena
Italian Renaissance painters